Ferreri may refer to:

People
 Jean-Marc Ferreri (born 1962), French footballer of Italian origin
 Juan Ferreri (born 1970), Uruguayan footballer
 Giusy Ferreri (born 1979), Italian singer-songwriter
 Marco Ferreri (1928–1997), Italian film director, screenwriter and actor
 Walter Ferreri, Italian astronomer

Other
 3308 Ferreri, main-belt asteroid